Jamal E. Duff (born March 11, 1972) is an American actor and former American football player in the National Football League (NFL).

Early years
Duff was born in Columbus, Ohio, but as a child, moved west with his family to Tustin, California, where he played football for Foothill High School. His older brother, John, also played football and went to New Mexico to play collegiately. However, Jamal played his college football at San Diego State University, carrying a major in graphic design. As a junior in 1993, Duff was named the Aztecs' Outstanding Defensive Player of the Year. As a senior, he notched 35 tackles and 7.5 sacks and was a second-team All-Western Athletic Conference selection.

As a professional
Jamal Duff went to the NFL where he was drafted in the sixth round of the 1995 NFL Draft by the New York Giants. Duff played in all but one of New York's 16 regular-season games, starting two at defensive end, and recording four sacks. After spending the 1996 season on injured reserve with a foot injury, Duff signed with the Washington Redskins, playing 26 games over two seasons (1997–98) and recording five sacks. After Duff was released, he appeared in training camp with the 2000 Oakland Raiders but did not make the team.

The following spring, the Los Angeles Xtreme of the XFL came calling; LA head coach Al Luginbill had coached Duff at San Diego State in 1993. Duff became a fan favorite as one of the Xtreme's top defensive players (recording 18 tackles and four sacks), but also for his nickname. Thanks to an XFL rule that allowed players to put anything they wanted on the backs of their jerseys (within reason), Duff decided to name himself after an underground black comic strip character: Death Blow. The nickname was a hit with fans, and probably the second-most well-known in the entire XFL, after Rod Smart's moniker "He Hate Me". The Xtreme won the XFL's first (and only) title.

Acting career
While working as a graphic artist in Los Angeles, Duff moved into acting. He has appeared in S.W.A.T., The Rundown, The Eliminator, Dodgeball: A True Underdog Story, Revenge, Two and a Half Men, The Game Plan, Brooklyn Nine-Nine, Torque, and Better Call Saul.

See also
History of the New York Giants (1994-present)

External links

American male film actors
American football defensive linemen
New York Giants players
Washington Redskins players
San Diego State Aztecs football players
Players of American football from Columbus, Ohio
1972 births
Living people
Los Angeles Xtreme players